Cementerio del Norte may refer to:
 Cementerio del Norte, Madrid, Spain (disestablished)
 Manila North Cemetery, Philippines
 Cementerio del Norte, Montevideo, Uruguay
 La Recoleta Cemetery, Buenos Aires, Argentina